Sulphur High School is a public high school located in Sulphur, Oklahoma.

Academics
In 2020, 97.7% of the school's seniors received their high school diploma, and 34.6% dropped out. The average GPA of the school's seniors was 1.9.

Proficiency testing
In Reading, 105 students took the reading proficiency test. 2% of the students who were tested in reading were Unsatisfactory, 23% Limited Knowledge, 56% Proficient, and 19% Advanced. In Mathematics, 101 students took the math proficiency test. 4% of the students who were tested in mathematics were Unsatisfactory, 35% Limited Knowledge, 33% Proficient, and 29% Advanced. Reading and Math proficiency is determined by student results on the school's Oklahoma Core Curriculum Tests, End of Instruction Secondary Tests.

References

External links
 
 Sulphur Public Schools

Public high schools in Oklahoma
Schools in Murray County, Oklahoma